Mahendra Prakash Singh Bhogta was twice the state legislative assembly member from Chatra from 1985 to 1995. He was a member of the Bharatiya Janata Party. 

He was from Bhogta community. Later his son Jay Prakash Singh Bhogta became MLA. He died due to heart attack in 1997 by witnessing 10 dead Maoists of Communist Party of India (Marxist–Leninist) killed by Maoist of Maoist Communist Centre of India.

References 

Year of birth missing
People from Chatra district
Bihar MLAs 1985–1990
Bihar MLAs 1990–1995
Bharatiya Janata Party politicians from Jharkhand
1997 deaths
Nagpuria people